ARTS (Atmospheric Radiative Transfer Simulator) is a widely used<ref
name="garlic"></ref>
atmospheric radiative transfer simulator for infrared, microwave, and sub-millimeter wavelengths.<ref
name="paper"></ref>
While the model is developed by a community, core development is done by the University of Hamburg and Chalmers University, with previous participation from Luleå University of Technology and University of Bremen.

Whereas most radiative transfer models are developed for a specific instrument, ARTS is one of few models that aims to be generically applicable.<ref
name="burrows"></ref>
It is designed from basic physical principles and has been used in a wide range of situations. It supports fully polarised radiative transfer calculations in clear-sky or cloudy conditions in 1-D, 2-D, or 3-D geometries,<ref
name="herbin"></ref>
including the calculations of Jacobians. 
Cloudy simulations support liquid and ice clouds with particles of varying sizes and shapes<ref
name="esa"></ref>
and supports multiple-scattering simulations.<ref
name="griessbach"></ref>
Absorption is calculated line-by-line, with continua<ref
name="matz"></ref>
or using a lookup table.<ref
name="lut"></ref>
The user programs ARTS by the means of a simple scripting language.<ref
name="paper" />
ARTS is a physics-based model and therefore much slower than many radiative transfer models that are used operationally and is currently unable to simulate solar, visible, or shortwave radiation.

ARTS has been used at the University of Maryland to assess radiosonde humidity measurements,<ref
name="moradi"></ref>
by the University of Bern for water vapour retrievals,<ref
name="tschanz"></ref>
by the Norwegian University of Science and Technology for Carbon monoxide retrievals above Antarctica,<ref
name="co"></ref>
and by the Japanese space agency JAXA to aid the development of retrievals from JEM/SMILES,<ref
name="jaxa"></ref>
among others.  According to the ARTS website  ARTS has been used in at least 154 peer-reviewed scientific publications.

See also
 Atmospheric radiative transfer codes

References

Science software